Canada–Panama relations are foreign relations between Canada and Panama.  The two countries established diplomatic relations in 1961. Canada has an embassy in Panama City which was opened in 1995. Prior to that date, the resident Canadian ambassador in Costa Rica has concurrent accreditation in Panama. Panama has an embassy in Ottawa and general consulates in Montreal, Toronto and Vancouver. Both countries are full members of the Organization of American States.

In August 2009, Canadian Prime Minister Stephen Harper and Panamanian President Ricardo Martinelli signed a bilateral free trade agreement known as the Canada–Panama Free Trade Agreement. It was formally ratified by the Parliament of Canada three years later and entered into force on April 1, 2013. In 2010, 2011 and 2012, the total yearly trade between the two countries was estimated to be between 200M$ and 250M$.

In 2008, Canada and Panama made an air transport agreement. This agreement put into place a new, modern framework for scheduled air services between Canada and Panama. This agreement is responsible for increase tourism since 2008, between Canada and Panama.

See also 
 Foreign relations of Canada 
 Foreign relations of Panama

References

External links 
   Canadian Ministry of Foreign Affairs and International Trade about relations with Panama
  Canadian embassy in Panama City
  Panamean embassy in Ottawa

 
Panama
Bilateral relations of Panama